Chennur is a village in Gudur mandal in Nellore district in the Indian state of Andhra Pradesh.

Demographics
 India census, Chennur had a population of 9,303. Males constitute 50% of the population. Chennur has an average literacy rate of 47%.

As per constitution of India and Panchyati Raaj Act, Chennuru village is administrated by Sarpanch (Head of Village) who is elected representative of village. 

Dussera celebrations are very grand in this village and  enjoyable irrespective of religion.

Chennuru has many educated families and the nearest town from chennuru is Gudur. Most of the business people in gudur are from this village.

All major schools in Gudur has bus transport service to this village.

Temples in the village : Shivalayam, Chennakeshavalayam, Anjaneya devastanam, Kattalamma, Sai baba alayam, Grama devata,

Schools : Mitra Mandali, Bethani English medium school, Saraswati vidhyalayam, Govt School, Govt High school for Boys and Girls.

References

Villages in Nellore district